Daichi Taniguchi (born April 15, 1990) is a Japanese professional basketball player for Shimane Susanoo Magic of the B.League in Japan. He stood six feet, three inches tall as a 12-year-old boy. In 2009 Taniguchi won the "Slam Dunk Scholarship" funded by Takehiko Inoue, and played for the American colleges. He rejected the offers from the Kansai-area clubs and signed with the Akita Happinets in 2015. Due to the B.League's foreign player regulations, he receives significantly more playing time in 2016-17. He has been named the new Akita captain after Toshino's departure in November 2018. He is a Starbucks mug cup collector and a tropical fish addict. Use of the moai emoji is usually meant to imply strength or determination, and it's also used frequently in Taniguchi's posts.  He signed with Hiroshima Dragonflies on June 24, 2019.

College statistics

|-
| style="text-align:left;"| 2010-11
| style="text-align:left;"| Arizona Western 
| 32 ||  ||  || .450 || .380 || .810|| 2.063 ||0.313  ||0.375  || 0.344 || 6.4
|-
| style="text-align:left;"| 2011-12
| style="text-align:left;"| Arizona Western 
| 29 ||  ||  || .350 || .200 || .570||1.828  ||0.448  || 0.103 || 0.310 || 3.8
|-
| style="text-align:left;"| 2013-14
| style="text-align:left;"| SE OK State 
| 27 || 16 ||24.3  || .372 || .351 || .667||2.67  ||1.74  || 0.52 || 0.37 || 5.52
|-
| style="text-align:left;"| 2014-15
| style="text-align:left;"| SE OK State 
| 9 || 2 ||6.4  || .100 || .111 || .000||0.22  || 0.33 || 0|| 0 || 0.33
|-

Career statistics

Regular season 

|-
| align="left" | bj League 2015-16
| align="left" | Akita
| 24 ||  || 6.4 || 43.4 || 0 || 50 ||1.2  ||0.2 ||0.1||0.2|| 2.1
|-
|style="background-color:#FFCCCC"  align="left" | B League 2016-17
| align="left" | Akita
|58||37 || 18.1|| 36.1 || 31.6 || 25 ||2.4  ||0.7 ||0.5 || 0.5 || 5.4
|-
| align="left" | B League 2017-18
| align="left" | Akita
|60|| 35||15.3||36.5||31.8||64||2.9||1.2||1||0.2||5.8
|-
| align="left" | B League 2018-19
| align="left" | Akita
|58  ||  ||8.4  || 35.0 ||34.2  ||50.0 ||  1.1 || 0.7  ||0.3  ||0.1||3.4
|-
| align="left" | B League 2019-20
| align="left" | Hiroshima
|45  ||  ||9.0  || 43.1 ||39.0  ||72.2 ||  1.9 || 0.6  ||0.3  ||0.2||3.4
|-
| align="left" | B League 2020-21
| align="left" | Hiroshima
|31  ||  ||7.1  ||.367 ||.375  ||.923 ||  0.8 || 0.3  ||0.3  ||0.1||2.2
|-

Playoffs 

|-
|style="text-align:left;"|2016-17
|style="text-align:left;"|Akita
| 2 ||  ||20.00 || .118 || .133 || .500 || 3.5 || 0.5 || 0.0 || 0.5 ||3.5
|-
|style="text-align:left;"|2017-18
|style="text-align:left;"|Akita
| 5 || 4 || 9.39 || .435 || .421 || 1.000 || 1.4 || 0.6 || 0.4 || 0 || 6.0
|-

Early cup games 

|-
|style="text-align:left;"|2017
|style="text-align:left;"|Akita
| 2 ||2  ||18:04 || .500 || .571 || .000 || 2.5 || 3.0 || 0.0 || 0.0 ||9.0
|-
|style="text-align:left;"|2018
|style="text-align:left;"|Akita
| 2 ||1  ||7:55 || .143 || .143 || .500 || 0.5 || 1.5 || 0.0 || 0.0 ||2.0
|-
|style="text-align:left;"|2019
|style="text-align:left;"|Hiroshima
| 3 ||0  ||14:03 || .231 || .000 || .500 || 1.7 || 1.3 || 1.3 || 0.3 ||3.0
|-

Preseason games

|-
| align="left" |2018
| align="left" | Akita
| 2 || 1 || 8.5 || .333 ||.200  || .000||1.5 || 1.0|| 0.0 || 0.0 ||  2.5
|-

Source: Changwon1Changwon2

Personal
He is the son of Kimiya and Sachiko Taniguchi. His brother Hiroki plays for the Shiga Lakestars of the B.League.

External links
RealGM bio
Savage Storm profile
Stats in Japan
DT times
19-20 Highlights

References

1990 births
Living people
Akita Northern Happinets players
Arizona Western Matadors men's basketball players
Hiroshima Dragonflies players
Japanese expatriate basketball people in the United States
Japanese men's basketball players
Southeastern Oklahoma State Savage Storm men's basketball players
South Kent School alumni
Sportspeople from Nara Prefecture
Centers (basketball)
Forwards (basketball)